The Rex Hospital Open is a regular golf tournament on the Korn Ferry Tour. It is played annually at the TPC Wakefield Plantation in Raleigh, North Carolina.

Winners

Bolded golfers graduated to the PGA Tour via the Korn Ferry Tour regular-season money list.

Notes

References

External links

Coverage on the Korn Ferry Tour's official site

Korn Ferry Tour events
Golf in North Carolina
Sports competitions in Raleigh, North Carolina
Recurring sporting events established in 1994
1994 establishments in North Carolina